Thrasybulus was a tyrant who ruled Syracuse for eleven months during 466 and 465 BC.  He was a member of the Deinomenid family and the brother of the previous tyrant Hiero, who seized power in Syracuse by convincing Gelon's son to give up his claim to the leadership of Syracuse.  A few months later, members of the Deinomenid family overthrew him.  However, the Deinomenid family was subsequently overthrown and a democracy was established in Syracuse.

Notes

|width=25% align=center|Preceded by:Hieron I
|width=25% align=center|Tyrant of Syracuse466 BC– 465 BC
|width=25% align=center|Succeeded by:democracy position next held by Dionysius I in 405 BC
|-

Sicilian tyrants
5th-century BC Syracusans